The Karinba site is an archaeological site in Eniwa, Hokkaido of Japan. The site was designated a National Historic Site of Japan in 2005.

Overview 
The first known settlement of Eniwa was in the Initial Jōmon period in 7000 BCE at the Karinba site. The settlement received a surge of people in 2000 BCE, and stayed for many years. Many artifacts have been found, including lacquered combs, beads, earthenware, and stone accessories. The style is similar to the style at the Ebetsu Kofun Site and northern Tōhoku historic graves. During the Ainu settlement period (1200 CE until the Meiji era), there is historical evidence for settlements in the villages and further away on the plains. 

The collection at the Eniwa City Historical Museum includes an assemblage of Jōmon-period artifacts from the Karinba site that has been designated an Important Cultural Property.

References 

History of Hokkaido
Eniwa, Hokkaido
Jōmon period
Historic Sites of Japan
Archaeological sites in Japan